Peter Verbeken (born 15 April 1966 in Deinze) is a Belgian former professional road cyclist, who competed between 1989 and 1998. He had 17 wins in his career, and competed in three editions of the Vuelta a España.

Major results

1990
 6th Overall Vuelta a Aragón
1992
 8th Circuit des Frontières
1993
 1st  Overall Grand Prix Guillaume Tell
 1st La Côte Picarde
1994
 1st Stage 4 Tour DuPont
 1st Stage 6 Regio-Tour
 3rd Road race, National Road Championships
1995
 1st  Overall Grand Prix Guillaume Tell
1st Stage 6
1996
 3rd Kampioenschap van Vlaanderen
 6th Route Adélie
 10th Cholet-Pays de Loire
1997
 1st Flèche Hesbignonne
 3rd De Kustpijl
1998
 1st Flèche Hesbignonne

References

External links

1966 births
Living people
Belgian male cyclists
People from Deinze
Cyclists from East Flanders